Poliosia solovyevi is a moth in the family Erebidae. It was described by Vladimir Viktorovitch Dubatolov and Karol Bucsek in 2013. It is found in Vietnam.

References

Moths described in 2013
Lithosiina